Willem Johannes Ouweneel (born 2 June 1944 in Zaandam) is a Dutch biologist, philosopher and theologian. Ouweneel is a well-known writer and speaker among Evangelical circles in the Netherlands. He is widely regarded as a skilled debater. He graduated as a biologist and has three PhD degrees — in biology, theology, and philosophy. He also has numerous popular science books to his name.

Background 
Ouweneel spent his childhood years in Apeldoorn and Deventer. After elementary school he attended the Christian Lyceum at Apeldoorn. After his graduation Gymnasium Beta he studied biology at the University of Utrecht from 1962 to 1967, graduating cum laude with genetics and embryology as his main subjects.

After having worked as a biology teacher in Apeldoorn for a short time, he was a scientist at the Hubrecht Laboratory, Utrecht, from 1968 to 1976, researching the genetics of the fruit fly (Drosophila). During this period Ouweneel earned a doctorate in 1970 with a thesis on the fruit fly, Genetics, Morphology, and Development of Homoeotic Wing Tissue in the Eye of Drosophila melanogaster.

From 1975 onwards, Ouweneel was employed by the Evangelische Omroep, a Christian public broadcaster, where he produced and conducted many programs on radio and TV. Besides this job he also gave many lectures and studies in biblical fields and has written over 160 books on creationism, philosophy, and biblical topics. Ouweneel was also one of the founders of the Evangelische Hogeschool, which led to professorships at theological colleges in Belgium and the Netherlands. In 1986 Ouweneel obtained a doctorate in philosophy at the University of Amsterdam. Finally, in 1993 he was awarded a doctorate in theology at the University of the Orange Free State in Bloemfontein, South Africa.

He now lives in the municipality of Huis ter Heide, Utrecht. On March 28, 1969, he married Grada Gerhardina Terwel in Apeldoorn. They have four children; one of them (Evert Jan Ouweneel) is also a philosopher and works in related fields. A younger brother, Frank Ouweneel, is a Bible teacher.

Career
From 1977 to 2009 Ouweneel lectured at the Evangelische Hogeschool in Amersfoort. At this institution, of which he was a founding member, he taught philosophy and cultural history. He was also professor of philosophy at the University of Potchefstroom in South Africa and lecturer in dogmatics and Biblical Studies at the Evangelical School of Theology in Suriname. He also worked as a lecturer in German and French at De Passie Evangelical School in Utrecht.

He is also Professor of dogmatics at the Evangelical Theological Faculty in Leuven (Belgium) and lecturer in dogmatics at the Evangelical Theological Academy in Zwijndrecht, Netherlands.

Evangelical broadcasting 
From the 1970s through the 1990s, Ouweneel was a familiar figure in the Evangelische Omroep network of the Netherlands, although his participation in this endeavor has declined in recent years. From the early 1980s up to 5 July 2008 he was a panelist commenting on social and church-related events in the EO radio program Deze Week on Saturday nights. He was a guest speaker along with Henk Binnendijk at the EO Youth Day several times. He also hosted the EO radio commentary on the church cantatas of Johann Sebastian Bach for many years. He was more interested in the theological than the musical aspects of these cantatas.

Theological views
Ouweneel grew up in the Kelly-Lowe-Continental branch of the Exclusive Brethren movement, where his father was a well-known preacher. He stated in an interview in 2004 that following a split among the Exclusive Brethren in 1995, which saw the departure of hardliners, the lines of demarcation between them and the Open Brethren effectively disappeared, and his own congregation later merged with an Open Brethren assembly to form the Eykpunt Community (Christian Assembly), which he describes as "(a) non-aligned evangelical church" but unashamedly Brethren in character.

Ouweneel also preaches widely in churches of many other denominations. He is also a member of the Association for Reformational philosophy. Ouweneel can be characterized as a conservative Evangelical Christian. His beliefs are in accord with those traditionally held by Evangelical Protestant Christians, and he attributes a lot of his foundational views to the writings of the early Plymouth Brethren pioneers, as well as to Reformed and Evangelical theologians. He is known, however, to be flexible in his theology. Creationism and the Charismatic Movement are two areas where his theology has shifted in recent years.

Creation and Evolution
For a long time he was a young-earth creationist who believed that the earth was created no more than six to ten thousand years ago. He was an important collaborator in the creationist programs and books that Evangelische Omroep produced on this theme. Since about 2000, however, he has gradually redefined his previously stated belief in a literal creation week. He published some of his new ideas in the Christian science magazine Ellips, of which he was the chief editor. In it he described his former beliefs as "my creationist period".

In an article on his website Ouweneel suggested that he was now tending more towards a model of 'guided evolutionism' or theistic evolution, something he previously strongly opposed as "a slippery slope towards an ultimately unadulterated evolution faith." Ouweneel redefined himself as an "origins agnostic," which he defined as follows:

Ouweneel insisted that he still believed in a creator God, but did not discuss at great length how much precisely. For some time he had sympathy for the Intelligent design movement, but he also now puts in critical comments. In February 2009 he called some forms of creationism pseudoscience, a term he had previously reserved for "evolutionism". Because of this change in his thinking some consternation arose among the rank and (former) employees of the EO, sometimes even vehement reproach.

In an interview on 18 April 2015, however, Ouweneel clarified that he thought he had been misunderstood. It was "not entirely correct", he said, that he had embraced theistic evolution. What would be more correct, he stated, was that he believed in keeping "an open mind" about the exegesis of the first three chapters of Genesis.

The Charismatic Movement 
For most of his life, Ouweneel was a strong cessationist. He believed, along with most of his fellow-Brethren, that the so-called sign gifts such as miracles, divine healing, and speaking in tongues were given to the early church for the specific purpose of authenticating the apostles, and "ceased" with the death of the last apostle. He began to reconsider his views in the early 2000s, however, after claiming that his daughter had been supernaturally healed of infertility after visiting the Nigerian pastor and faith healer T.B. Joshua. In a 2004 interview, he said he had apologized both personally and publicly to Pentecostal and Charismatic Christians for his earlier strong criticism of their movement.

Ouweneel has since become increasingly identified with the Charismatic Movement and has worked closely with Touch Reach and Impact the Nations (TRIN), a charismatic missionary organization which organizes revival meetings. While this has increased his appeal in Pentecostal and Charismatic circles, some conservative evangelicals have been disappointed at his abandonment of cessationism.

Politics 
Ouweneel stood as a candidate for the Reformatory Political Federation (RPF) in 1998. This also marked a departure from his previous stance opposing the participation of Christians in politics. Today, he is a member of the ChristianUnion, the successor to the RPF. In the general election of 2003, he was the twenty-first candidate on the electoral list of the ChristianUnion, garnering 1,921 votes.

Theistic Manifesto
In 1995, philosopher Herman Philipse published the Atheist Manifesto. A second revised edition appeared in 2003. Philipse argues in this manifesto that atheism is logically provable. The non-existence of God would be determined by science. Ouweneel responded in March 2005 by publishing a book criticizing Philipse's reasoning. His book is titled: The God that is: why I am not an atheist. Ouweneel argues in this book that there is absolutely no reasonable argument for atheism. According to Ouweneel, atheism has very far-reaching consequences.

Criticism
Willem Ouweneel has faced some criticism from conservative evangelical Christians for his endorsement of the Nigerian faith healer T.B. Joshua, some of whom doubt the genuineness of supernatural gifts in general, and/or of T.B. Joshua personally. Conservatives have also criticized his involvement in the Charismatic organization TRIN and his collaboration with charismatic evangelist Mattheus van der Steen.

Some have also criticized his relatively recent reappraisal of the Creationism versus Evolution debate, including his ambivalence concerning how the seven days in the Biblical creation story should be understood — whether literally or figuratively.

In "normal" scientific and theological circles, Ouweneel finds little resonance for his theories. He is rarely cited in academic theological publications. Some claim that despite the large number of books Ouweneel has authored, it is not easy to get a clear picture of his opinion of theological subjects. In addition, some critics accuse him of vacillating in his writings and lectures or of contradicting what he has written in previous publications.

References

External links
 Willem Ouweneel's website

1944 births
Living people
20th-century Dutch philosophers
21st-century Dutch philosophers
Calvinist and Reformed philosophers
Dutch biologists
Dutch Charismatics
Dutch geneticists
Dutch Plymouth Brethren
Dutch Protestant theologians
People from Apeldoorn 
People from Zaanstad
Theistic evolutionists
University of Amsterdam alumni
University of the Free State alumni
Utrecht University alumni